The name Daisy has been used for six tropical cyclones world wide: two in the Atlantic Ocean, three in the south-west Indian Ocean, and one in the Australian region of the Indian Ocean.

In the Atlantic:
 Hurricane Daisy (1958), remained far enough offshore to not cause any damage
 Hurricane Daisy (1962), damage over $1.1 million (1962 USD) in New England and the Canadian Maritimes

In the Southwest Indian:
 Cyclone Daisy (1962), struck Madagascar
 Cyclone Daisy (1965), re-designated from Cyclone Carol upon crossing from the Australian region.
 Cyclone Daisy (1994), struck Madagascar

In the Australian region:
 Cyclone Daisy (1972), caused some flooding near Brisbane

Atlantic hurricane set index articles
South-West Indian Ocean cyclone set index articles
Australian region cyclone set index articles